KZJF (104.1 FM) was a radio station that broadcast a classic hits format. Licensed to Jefferson City, Missouri, United States, the station was owned by Cumulus Media.

History
The station was assigned the call letters KBQF on October 29, 1999. The call letters were changed to KJCQ on May 19, 2000, to KLIK-FM on November 16, 2001, to KBBM on July 21, 2003 to KBBM, to KJMO on September 12, 2003, and to KZJF on July 12, 2006.

On October 5, 2013, KZJF changed formats from country music as "Jeff 104.1" to sports talk as "104.1 The Fan"; the format was moved from sister station KBBM (100.1 FM). The format switch was completed two days later, when KBBM joined Cumulus Media's nationwide country branding as "Nash FM 100.1" after stunting for a day with Christmas music as "Santa 100.1".

KZJF was affiliated with CBS Sports Radio and, with the exception of a local program The Closers that was simulcast on Columbia sister station KFRU (1400 AM), aired the entire CBS Sports Radio lineup.  KZJF was also the mid-Missouri affiliate of the Kansas City Royals and carried most national sporting events from Westwood One, including NFL football broadcasts and the NCAA men's basketball tournament.

On June 22, 2015 at Noon, 104.1 flipped to classic hits as "Z104.1, Jefferson City’s Classic Hits". Tim Thomas, afternoon host at sister station KPLA, added additional duties as morning host. The rest of the dayutilize Westwood One's Classic Hits network. Kansas City Royals baseball broadcasts remained on the station.

Cumulus Media shut down KZJF and returned the license to the Federal Communications Commission (FCC) on May 25, 2018; the license was canceled on May 30. The classic hits format and Kansas City Royals broadcasts were transferred to sister station KJMO (97.5 FM). The shut down came in the wake of the bankruptcy restructuring of Cumulus Media; had KZJF not been shut down, it would have been required to divest KJMO.

References

External links

ZJF
Radio stations established in 2000
2000 establishments in Missouri
Radio stations disestablished in 2018
2018 disestablishments in Missouri
Defunct radio stations in the United States
Cumulus Media radio stations
ZJF